is a Japanese rugby union player who plays as a prop. He currently plays for Toyota Verblitz in Japan's domestic Top League.

International
Japan head coach Jamie Joseph has named Shunsuke Asaoka in a 52-man training squad ahead of British and Irish Lions test.

References

External Links
itsrugby.co.uk Profile

1996 births
Living people
People from Kyoto Prefecture
Sportspeople from Kyoto Prefecture
Japanese rugby union players
Rugby union props
Toyota Verblitz players